Sandgap is a small, unincorporated community in northwestern Jackson County, KY. It is located along U.S. Route 421, at its junction with KY Route 2004. Sandgap Elementary School (K-5) is located in the community and is operated by the Jackson County Public School system. The community offers a few services such as a post office, grocery store, and gas station.

References

Unincorporated communities in Jackson County, Kentucky
Unincorporated communities in Kentucky